Joseph Mwasile (born 6 July 1993) is an Zambian footballer who plays as a midfielder for City of Liverpool. He played in the Football League for Morecambe.

Career
Mwasile made his debut for Morecambe on 17 March 2012, in a 6–0 win over Barnet, coming on as a late substitute for Jordan Burrow.

In October 2012 he joined Workington on loan, scoring his first goal for the club on 24 October in a 2–1 league match win over Altrincham.

It was announced that Mwasile was released by Morecambe on 6 May 2014 along with three other players. He then played for Workington, where he had previously been on loan in 2012.

In the summer of 2015 he joined Salford City and left the club in May 2016. He subsequently signed for Marine and in November 2016 he joined Nantwich Town.

In July 2017 he signed for Warrington Town and scored on his league debut for the club having come on as a substitute. October 2017 saw Mwasile return to Nantwich Town and he clocked up his 150th appearance for the Dabbers at Radcliffe in March 2020.

In February 2022 he joined Witton Albion. In August 2022, Mwasile returned to Nantwich Town.

References

External links

1993 births
Living people
English footballers
Association football midfielders
Morecambe F.C. players
Workington A.F.C. players
Altrincham F.C. players
Barrow A.F.C. players
English Football League players
National League (English football) players
Salford City F.C. players
Burscough F.C. players
Northern Premier League players
Marine F.C. players
Nantwich Town F.C. players
Warrington Town F.C. players
Witton Albion F.C. players